The Monteleone chariot is an Etruscan chariot dated to c. 530 BC, considered one of the world's great archaeological finds. It was originally uncovered at Monteleone di Spoleto and is currently a star attraction in the collection of the Metropolitan Museum of Art in New York City.

Though about 300 ancient chariots are known to still exist, only six are reasonably complete, and the Monteleone chariot is the best-preserved  and most complete  of all known surviving examples. Carlos Picón, curator of the museum's Greek and Roman department, has called it "the grandest piece of sixth-century Etruscan bronze anywhere in the world."

Description

The Monteleone chariot was part of a chariot burial, containing the remains of two human corpses, along with two drinking cups. Measuring  in height and designed to be drawn by two horses, the chariot itself is constructed of wood covered with hammered bronze plates and carved ivory decoration. The bronze plates are decorated with Homeric iconography; the main panel depicts Achilles being handed his armor by his mother, Thetis. The chariot's frame and plating is additionally adorned with animals and legendary creatures, rendered in detail. The chariot's decorations would also have included inlaid amber and other exotic materials, but only the bronze and ivory decorations have survived. The chariot's wheels have nine spokes (rather than the classical Greek four, the Egyptian six, or the Assyrian and Persian eight; excavated chariots from Celtic burials have up to twelve spokes).

Contemporary curators at the Museum had long suspected that the chariot's original 1903 reconstruction was not historically accurate. In 1989, under the direction of Italian archaeologist Adriana Emiliozzi, the Metropolitan Museum began a five-year reexamination and restoration of the chariot. During the restoration, it was discovered that the chariot had in fact been originally assembled incorrectly; additionally, evidence was uncovered indicating that the chariot, previously thought to have seen little actual use, had in fact been involved in a serious accident at some point during its life. The newly restored chariot's reinstallation was scheduled as part of the major renovations of the Metropolitan Museum's Greek and Roman galleries, opening to the public on April 20, 2007.

History

It was found in 1902 in Monteleone di Spoleto, near Spoleto in the province of Umbria, by a farmer named Isidoro Vannozzi who inadvertently unearthed it while digging a wine cellar or basement barn. Its history from that time is the subject of controversy. According to some accounts, Vannozzi hid the chariot in his barn, concerned that the authorities might confiscate it, and later sold it to two Frenchmen in exchange for two cows. Another account, related by Vannozzi's son Giuseppe, holds that the chariot was immediately sold as scrap metal, and the proceeds from the sale used to buy roof tiles. Changing hands several times after its initial sale, the chariot was eventually purchased in Paris by J. P. Morgan, who sent it to the Metropolitan Museum in 1903, where its first restoration took place.

Because the museum's acquisition of the chariot in 1903 predates by six years Italy's first laws restricting export of items that carry "cultural and artistic values," the chariot's sale was legal at the time of purchase, though debated by the contemporary press. In January 2005, the comune of Monteleone began a campaign aimed at recovering the chariot from the Met; their efforts, however, did not receive the backing of the Italian government. The Metropolitan Museum has responded that the chariot was "purchased in good faith".  A full-size copy was made in the mid-20th century, which is on display in Monteleone.

References

External links

Images & description at www.metmuseum.org
 News report on the controversy (www.telegraph.co.uk)
Additional discussion of the legal case for repatriation

Chariots
Umbria
Art and cultural repatriation
Metalwork of the Metropolitan Museum of Art
Archaeological discoveries in Italy
Chariot burials
Arms and armor of the Metropolitan Museum of Art
Ancient art in metal